The 1998 Pontiac Excitement 400 was the 13th stock car race of the 1998 NASCAR Winston Cup Series season and the 44th iteration of the event. The race was held on Saturday, June 6, 1998, in Richmond, Virginia, at Richmond International Raceway, a 0.75 miles (1.21 km) D-shaped oval. The race took the scheduled 400 laps to complete. With two laps to go, Hendrick Motorsports driver Terry Labonte would make a final pass in a battle with Robert Yates Racing driver Dale Jarrett. On the fourth turn of the penultimate lap, the caution would come out for Johnny Benson Jr. Labonte was able to defend Jarrett and complete the penultimate lap to take his 20th career NASCAR Winston Cup Series victory and his only victory of the season. To fill out the podium, Jarrett and Penske-Kranefuss Racing driver Rusty Wallace would finish second and third, respectively.

Background 

Richmond International Raceway (RIR) is a 3/4-mile (1.2 km), D-shaped, asphalt race track located just outside Richmond, Virginia in Henrico County. It hosts the Monster Energy NASCAR Cup Series and Xfinity Series. Known as "America's premier short track", it formerly hosted a NASCAR Camping World Truck Series race, an IndyCar Series race, and two USAC sprint car races.

Entry list 

 (R) denotes rookie driver.

*Replaced by Kevin Lepage for Green to recover from a bruised shoulder.

Practice

First practice 
The first practice session was held on the early afternoon of Friday, June 5.

Second practice 
The second practice session was held on late afternoon of Friday, June 5.

Final practice 
The final practice session, sometimes referred to as Happy Hour, was held on the evening of Friday, June 5.

Qualifying 
Qualifying was split into two rounds. The first round was held on Friday, June 5, at 6:00 PM EST. Each driver would have one lap to set a time. During the first round, the top 25 drivers in the round would be guaranteed a starting spot in the race. If a driver was not able to guarantee a spot in the first round, they had the option to scrub their time from the first round and try and run a faster lap time in a second round qualifying run, held on Saturday, June 6, at 2:00 PM EST. As with the first round, each driver would have one lap to set a time. On January 24, 1998, NASCAR would announce that the amount of provisionals given would be increased from last season. Positions 26-36 would be decided on time, while positions 37-43 would be based on provisionals. Six spots are awarded by the use of provisionals based on owner's points. The seventh is awarded to a past champion who has not otherwise qualified for the race. If no past champion needs the provisional, the next team in the owner points will be awarded a provisional.

Two drivers would fail to qualify: Kevin Lepage and Buckshot Jones.

Full qualifying results 

*Time not available.

Race results

References 

1998 NASCAR Winston Cup Series
NASCAR races at Richmond Raceway
June 1998 sports events in the United States
1998 in sports in Virginia